Coins of China could refer to:
 Ancient Chinese coinage
 Cash (Chinese coin)
 Coins of the Chinese yuan
 Coins of the modern Renminbi